Miklós Belényesi (born 15 May 1983) is a Romanian football forward of Hungarian ethnicity. He currently plays for Balmazújvárosi FC.

External links
 Player profile at HLSZ 

1983 births
Living people
People from Valea lui Mihai
Romanian footballers
Romanian sportspeople of Hungarian descent
Association football midfielders
Debreceni VSC players
Romanian expatriate sportspeople in Hungary
Romanian expatriate sportspeople in Austria
Dunaújváros FC players
Diósgyőri VTK players
Paksi FC players
Nyíregyháza Spartacus FC players
Szolnoki MÁV FC footballers
Balmazújvárosi FC players
Nemzeti Bajnokság I players
Romanian expatriate footballers
Expatriate footballers in Austria
Expatriate footballers in Hungary